Yuliya Rakhmanova (born 25 October 1991) is a Kazakhstani sprinter specialising in the 400 metres. She has won several medals at continental level.

Her personal bests in the event are 52.61 seconds outdoors (Almaty 2015) and 53.75 seconds indoors (Chimkent 2013).

Competition record

References

1991 births
Living people
Kazakhstani female sprinters
Athletes (track and field) at the 2014 Asian Games
Athletes (track and field) at the 2016 Summer Olympics
Olympic athletes of Kazakhstan
Universiade medalists in athletics (track and field)
Universiade gold medalists for Kazakhstan
Asian Games competitors for Kazakhstan
Medalists at the 2015 Summer Universiade
Olympic female sprinters
20th-century Kazakhstani women
21st-century Kazakhstani women